Galt Museum & Archives is the primary museum in Lethbridge, Alberta, Canada, and is the largest museum in the province south of Calgary. In 2006, the museum cared for a growing collection of over 20,000 artifacts and 300,000 archival documents and photographs record the history of Lethbridge and southern Alberta. It attracts over 50,000 visitors every year.

History

A Scientific and Historical Society was formed in Lethbridge in October 1888. Little was done for record archives, and emphasis for the society laid with the presentation of papers at bi-weekly meetings.

In 1944, Walter Gurney opened a private museum—the first museum in the city. The building that housed Gurney's Museum was originally built as a bandstand, no more than a platform with a railing. By 1909 several improvements had been made, and the transforming the bandstand into a two-storey structure with a bandstand on the upper level, and a glass fronted room at ground level. The bandstand was reached by a set of stairs on the outside of the building. The ground floor was housed the Board of Trade, and became known as the Board of Trade Building. The building was originally located about 30 metres inside the west boundary of Galt Gardens, opposite 118 5 Street South. In 1911 the building was moved to a location halfway along the north boundary of the park. In June 1912 two wings were added.

In February 1922 the Board of Trade Building suffered a fire but was repaired. The Board of Trade continued to operate out of the building until 1944 when they moved operations to the Marquis Hotel. Walter Gurney and his wife then applied to lease the building to house their museum, and it became Gurney's Museum until 1961. On 28 August 1961 the building was demolished. When the museum closed many of its artifacts moved to the private Altamont Museum in the nearby town of Coutts, Alberta.

The first civic museum opened in 1964 with George McKillop as curator. It was located in three rooms in the former Bowman Elementary School (now Bowman Arts Centre). The museum quickly outgrew its space and within three years had moved into the considerably renovated former Galt Hospital. The Sir Alexander Galt Museum and Archives was operated until 1971 by The Lethbridge and District Historical Society.

Expansion 

In the early 1980s, the museum was placed in the Urban Parks Program and the museum expanded to include additional gallery space and expanded storage space. The new space allowed for the development of new programs and temporary exhibits.

In September 2004, the museum moved its offices and collections off-site to facilitate a $8.9 million expansion. Government funding for the project included $3.13 million from the City of Lethbridge, $1.9 million from the Government of Canada, and $1.45 million from the Province of Alberta. The museum reopened on 6 May 2006, and was renamed the Galt Museum & Archives. This renovation included: Discovery Hall, a  exhibit centre with the permanent exhibit "Exploring Southwestern Alberta" and frequently changing temporary exhibits; a larger store; and the  Galt Education Centre.

Awards

In 2003, the museum was awarded the Museums Alberta Award of Excellence for Exhibitions for its "Ancestors" exhibit. The exhibit was a result of a partnership with the Royal Ontario Museum and the British Museum in London, England.

The Galt has since been awarded with recognitions for excellence in programming, curation, marketing and tourism initiatives, horticulture and archival and collections management, including the following:
 Award of Merit for "History on Tap" program, Alberta Museums Association, 1991
 Programming–Exhibits Award for Akaitapiiwa–Ancestors Exhibit, Alberta Museums Association, 2003
 Marketing Excellence Award Finalist for Year of the Coalminer, Alberta Tourism Marketing Awards, 2004
 Marketing Partnership Award Finalist for Year of the Coalminer, Alberta Tourism Marketing Awards, 2004
 Tourism Partnership Initiative Award for Year of the Coalminer, Chinook Country Tourist Association, 2004
 Museums and Society Award for Year of the Coalminer, Alberta Museums Association, 2005
 Change and Innovation Award, Lethbridge Chamber of Commerce, 2007
 Collections Award in Collections Management for Operation Homecoming, Alberta Museums Association, 2007
 Programming Award in the Exhibits Category for Auschwitz: The Eva Brewster Story, Alberta Museums Association, 2007
 Marketing Excellence Award for Auschwitz: The Eva Brewster Story, Chinook Country Toursit Association, 2007
 Community Organization Award, The Aboriginal Council of Lethbridge and the Lethbridge Aboriginal Awareness Week Planning Committee, 2011
 5 Blooms for the Native Prairie Plants Garden at Galt Museum, Communities in Bloom, 2012
 Leadership Award for Engagement, Alberta Museums Association, 2013
 Award for Excellence in Museums Finalist, Governor General's History Awards, 2016

References

External links

Culture of Lethbridge
Museums in Alberta
History museums in Alberta
Museums established in 1964
1964 establishments in Alberta
Archives in Canada